= S-specific spore photoproduct lyase =

Enzyme

Identifiers
- EC no.: 4.1.99.15
- CAS no.: 37290-70-3

Databases
- IntEnz: IntEnz view
- BRENDA: BRENDA entry
- ExPASy: NiceZyme view
- KEGG: KEGG entry
- MetaCyc: metabolic pathway
- PRIAM: profile
- PDB structures: RCSB PDB PDBe PDBsum
Search
- PMC: articles
- PubMed: articles
- NCBI: proteins

S-specific spore photoproduct lyase (EC 4.1.99.15, SAM, SP lyase, SPL, SplB, SplG) is an enzyme with systematic name S-specific spore photoproduct pyrimidine-lyase. This enzyme catalyses the following chemical reaction

(5S)-5,6-dihydro-5-(thymidin-7-yl)thymidine (in DNA) + S-adenosyl-L-methionine $\rightleftharpoons$ thymidylyl-(3'->5')-thymidylate (in DNA) + 5'-deoxyadenosine + L-methionine

This enzyme is an iron-sulfur protein.
